Natural History is the debut album by English rock band I Am Kloot, released to much eagerness from the British music press in 2001. The album was produced by Guy Garvey, lead singer for the Manchester-based band Elbow.

Although reaching a low chart placing outside the top 100, the band built up a dedicated and loyal fanbase through touring and promotion. The album itself is widely viewed as  some of I Am Kloot's best work to date. Prior to the album's release, the band released two singles on Ugly Man Records: "Titanic"/"To You" in November 1999, and "Twist"/"86 TV's" in March 2000. The album itself spawned two further singles: "Dark Star" in February 2001, and "Morning Rain" in July 2001.

All songs written by John Harold Arnold Bramwell.

Track listing 

The remastered 2013 edition includes three bonus tracks: "Titanic", "Over My Shoulder" and "Stand Another Drink (Proof)".

Track listing (different running order) 

The Japanese edition includes two bonus tracks: "Over My Shoulder" and "Titanic".

Contributing musicians
Guy Garvey: backing vocals, percussion, sound effects, harmonica, wine glasses
Pete Turner, Craig Potter, Mark Potter and Richard Jupp: wine glasses on "Because"

Album ratings 
{{Album ratings|align=left
|rev1 = The Independent
|rev1score= (favourable)
|rev2 = Allmusic
|rev2score = 
|rev3 = NME
|rev3score = 
|rev4 = The Guardian'
|rev4score = 
|rev5 = Yahoo! Music UK & Ireland
|rev5score = 
|rev6 = London Evening Standard|rev6score = 
}}

 Singles sources:''

References 

2001 debut albums
I Am Kloot albums